Marius Lacombe (7 February 1862 – 19 March 1938) was a Swiss mathematician.

Life and work 
Lacombe studied mathematics at Engineers Department of the ETH Zurich. From 1890 to 1894 he was teaching descriptive geometry in the university of Lausanne. In 1894 he was appointed professor at ETH Zurich to fill a newly created chair of descriptive geometry in French language. After fourteen years in Zurich, in 1908 he returned to university of Lausane, where he retired in 1927.

He was more a teacher than a researcher. His only known works deal on pedagogy of mathematics. In 1896 he was one of the organizers of the first International Congress of Mathematicians.

References

Bibliography

External links 
 

1862 births
1938 deaths
19th-century Swiss mathematicians
20th-century Swiss mathematicians